Đorđe Rakić (born 31 October 1985) is a Serbian former professional footballer who played as a striker.

Career

Club career
Rakić played for Radnički Kragujevac from 1992 until January 2006, then for OFK Beograd. In August 2007, he was transferred to Red Bull Salzburg. On 31 August 2008, he was loaned out to Reggina. He returned to Salzburg on 1 July 2009. He mostly played for the Red Bull Salzburg Juniors squad. However he was included in the first team squad for the second leg of playoff round of the UEFA Champions League qualifying phase against Maccabi Haifa. He was given the number 27 shirt for the first team. After being promoted from the reserves at Red Bull Salzburg, he signed a half-year loan deal with TSV 1860 Munich on 1 February 2010. On 8 August 2010, he transferred permanently to 1860 Munich. He signed with Qatari club Al Gharafa in November 2012, on a three-month basis as cover for injured striker Afonso Alves. On 17 June 2013, he signed a two-year contract with former European champions Red Star Belgrade.

Later career
On 23 August 2019, he signed with Greek Football League club Kalamata. He left the club in January 2020, returning to NK Lokomotiva, before retiring at the end of the season. He was immediately appointed assistant coach of NK Lokomotiva.

International career
Rakić played for Serbia U21 team in the 2007 UEFA European Under-21 Championship in the Netherlands.

Personal life
Since June 2013 Đorđe Rakić is married to his German wife Kim Danielle. They welcomed their daughter Aviana on 2 July 2014.

Honours
Red Star
Serbian SuperLiga: 2013–14

References

External links
 
 

1985 births
Living people
Sportspeople from Kragujevac
Serbian footballers
Association football forwards
Serbia and Montenegro under-21 international footballers
Serbia under-21 international footballers
Footballers at the 2008 Summer Olympics
Olympic footballers of Serbia
FK Radnički 1923 players
OFK Beograd players
FC Red Bull Salzburg players
Reggina 1914 players
TSV 1860 Munich players
Al-Gharafa SC players
Al-Arabi SC (Qatar) players
Qingdao F.C. players
Zhejiang Professional F.C. players
NK Lokomotiva Zagreb players
Kalamata F.C. players
Red Star Belgrade footballers
Serbian SuperLiga players
Austrian Football Bundesliga players
Serie A players
2. Bundesliga players
Qatar Stars League players
China League One players
Croatian Football League players
Football League (Greece) players
Serbian expatriate footballers
Serbian expatriate sportspeople in Austria
Serbian expatriate sportspeople in Italy
Serbian expatriate sportspeople in Germany
Serbian expatriate sportspeople in Qatar
Serbian expatriate sportspeople in China
Serbian expatriate sportspeople in Croatia
Expatriate footballers in Austria
Expatriate footballers in Italy
Expatriate footballers in Germany
Expatriate footballers in Qatar
Expatriate footballers in China
Expatriate footballers in Croatia